Lalehabad District is a district (bakhsh) in Babol County, Mazandaran Province, Iran. At the 2006 census, its population was 49,383, in 12,737 families.  The District has one city: Zargarmahalleh.  The District has two rural districts (dehestan): Karipey Rural District and Lalehabad Rural District.

References 

Babol County
Districts of Mazandaran Province